Bitterwater Valley is a valley in San Benito County, California. Its mouth is located at an elevation of  near the confluence of Bitterwater Creek with Lewis Creek a tributary to San Lorenzo Creek, a tributary of the Salinas River.

References 

Valleys of San Benito County, California